Coleophora ramosella is a moth of the family Coleophoridae. It is found from Fennoscandia to the Pyrenees, Italy and Hungary and from Ireland to Slovakia. It is also found in southern Russia.

Coleophora ramosella is characterised by white lines on a yellowish-ochre ground colour. Only reliably identified by dissection and microscopic examination of the genitalia.

The larvae feed on Aster amellus, Aster linosyris, Bellis perennis, Hieracium and Solidago virgaurea. It is trivalved and has a mouth angle of about 20°. Full-grown larvae can be found in June.

References

External links
Bestimmungshilfe für die in Europa nachgewiesenen Schmetterlingsarten
Swedish moths

Ramosella
Moths described in 1849
Moths of Europe
Taxa named by Philipp Christoph Zeller